832 Karin is a minor planet orbiting the Sun. It is the largest and brightest member of the Karin Cluster, which is named after it. Found in 2002, the Karin cluster is notable for being very young. It is currently believed to have formed in a collision only 5.8 million years ago.

832 Karin is an S-Type asteroid, approximately 19 km in diameter.

The minor planet is named in honor of Karin Månsdotter, who was the mistress of Erik XIV of Sweden in the 16th century. In 1567, Erik married Karin, but he was pushed from his throne because of this marriage.

References

External links 
 Asteroid Lightcurve Database (LCDB), query form (info )
 Discovery Circumstances: Numbered Minor Planets (1)–(5000) Minor Planet Center
 
 

000832
000832
Discoveries by Max Wolf
Named minor planets
19160920